Tortricopsis aulacois is a moth of the family Oecophoridae. It is known from the Australian Capital Territory, New South Wales, Queensland, Tasmania and Victoria.

The larvae probably feed on Callitris species, because adults have been recorded on this plant.

References

Oecophorinae